Iris griffithii  is a plant species in the genus Iris, it is also in the subgenus Iris. It is a rhizomatous perennial, from Afghanistan. It has short, sickle-shaped leaves, short green stem and purple flowers with white beards. Several specimens exist within herbaria around Europe, but it is rarely cultivated.

Description
It is similar in form to Iris chamaeiris. Which is now a synonym of Iris lutescens. Although has various differences from it, to separate the two species.

It has a stout rhizome.

It is classed as a dwarf species. It is similar in size to Iris kashmiriana, but the rest of form is very different.

The stem has 2 stem leaves, from the midpoint, upwards, and a long green, spathes (leaves of the flower bud). The spathes are different to Iris pseudopumila, which has membranous and curled spathes.

The stem holds 2 terminal (top of stem) flowers, blooming early summer, between May or August.

The flowers come in shades of purple.
Like other irises, it has 2 pairs of petals, 3 large sepals (outer petals), known as the 'falls' and 3 inner, smaller petals (or tepals), known as the 'standards'.
The falls are about 5 cm long, in the centre of each petal, they have a dense white beard. The standards are about 4 cm long.

It has 3 cm long styles arms, and a 0.8 cm long anther.

After the iris has flowered, it produces a seed capsule, which has not yet been described.

Biochemistry
As most irises are diploid, having two sets of chromosomes, this can be used to identify hybrids and classification of groupings.
It has not been counted.

Taxonomy
The Latin specific epithet griffithii refers to William Griffith (1810–45), English botanist and Superintendent of Calcutta Botanic Garden. Who collected the iris in Afghanistan.

It was first published and described by Baker in 'Handbook of the Iridaceae' (Handb. Irid.) Vol.32. in 1892.

It was thought that no plants had been found in the wild, since William Rickatson Dykes had described the iris in 18,  but several specimens are stored within herbaria. Although, in 2012, it was listed on a checklist of the flowering plants of Afghanistan.
The herbarium specimens, have only one sterile leaf, and the colour has faded from the flowers.

It was verified by United States Department of Agriculture and the Agricultural Research Service on 4 April 2003, then updated on 2 December 2004.

It is not listed in the Encyclopedia of Life, as of 14 October 2015.

Iris griffithii is not an accepted name by the RHS, as of 14 October 2015.

Distribution and habitat
It is native to temperate central Asia.

Range
It is found in Afghanistan, (within the province of Kunar Province, and 
Nuristan Province,). Including on the border between north India and Afghanistan.

Cultivation
It is very difficult to find for sale or in cultivation.

It is thought best (by Dykes) to plant between May and August, after the flowers have faded.

Propagation
Irises can generally be propagated by division, or by seed growing.

Toxicity
Like many other irises, most parts of the plant are poisonous (rhizome and leaves), and if mistakenly ingested can cause stomach pains and vomiting. Handling the plant may cause skin irritation or an allergic reaction.

References

Sources
 Mathew, B. 1981. The Iris. 28.
 Rechinger, K. H., ed. 1963–. Flora iranica.

External links
Global Species notes (although has incorrect flowers)

griffithii
Plants described in 1892
Garden plants
Flora of Central Asia
Flora of Afghanistan